Hrdlořezy is a cadastral district in Prague. It has population of 1,666. It became part of Prague on 1 January 1922. It lies mostly in the municipal and administrative district of Prague 9 while a small part is in Prague 10. The district is bordered by Žižkov, Hloubětín, Kyje and Malešice.

References

Districts of Prague